Termopsidae is an extinct family of termites in the order Blattodea. The five extant genera formerly included in Termopsidae (Archotermopsis, Hodotermopsis, Porotermes, Stolotermes, and Zootermopsis) are now treated as part of the newer family Archotermopsidae, leaving only extinct taxa in Termopsidae.

Nomenclature
The group was originally described as a subfamily, Termopsinae, by Nils Holmgren in 1911, and was raised to the taxonomic rank of family by Pierre-Paul Grassé in 1949.

References

Termites
Prehistoric insect families
Taxa named by Pierre-Paul Grassé